Egyptian-South African relations is the relationship between the governments of the Arab Republic of Egypt and Republic of South Africa.  The first South African mission in Egypt was established in 1942 as a Consulate-General. Egypt maintained diplomatic relations with  South Africa until 1961.

Egypt  enforced all the international sanctions on the South African Government. After 1979, unofficial relations and military tensions were eased. Ambassadors were exchanged only in 1990. Egypt has an embassy in Pretoria and South Africa has an embassy in Cairo. Both countries are full members of the  African Union, G-24, Group of 77 and Non-Aligned Movement.

History 
Under British colonalism, a project was proposed to connect the capitals of Egypt and South Africa. The first South African Mission in Egypt was established in 1942 as a Consulate-General, converted to a Legation during 1949. South Africa's recognition of Israel in 1948 angered the Egtptian government, which had fought a war with Israel that year. Relations changed after the 1952 revolution in Egypt, as the Egyptian president Gamal Abdul Nasser began supporting African liberation movements after the Bandung Conference. In 1960, official relations were suspended as Egypt, then a part of the United Arab Republic, supported the anti-aparthied movement. Relations were hostile between the aparthied government and  the government of Egypt's president, Gamal Abdul Nasser, as Nasserist ideas were an inspiration to the anti-apartied movement. Nelson Mandela was personally inspired by Nasserism, seeing it as a model for his party, the African National Congress. Nasser's successor, Anwar Sadat, focused Egyptian foreign policy efforts to the Israel-Egyptian peace process, allowing Libyan leader Muammar Gaddafi to substitute Arab support for the anti-aparthied movement. However, Egypt would continue to support the anti-aparthied movement, supporting sanctions on South Africa until the end of aparthied. Egyptian politician Boutros Boutros-Ghali helped negoiate for the release of Nelson Mandela from prison. Egypt was the first country Mandela visited since becoming prime minister of South Africa after the end of aparthied. Today, both countries boast positive bilateral relations, having signed an extradition treaty in 2002, and focused on increaing trade between the two nations. Egypt is also considering joinging BRICS, an economic relationship between Brazil, Russia, India, China and South Africa.

See also 
 Foreign relations of Egypt
 Foreign relations of South Africa

References

External links 
  South African Department of Foreign Affairs about relations with Egypt

 
South Africa
Egypt